Kasper Wellemberg Lorentzen (born November 19, 1985) is a Danish retired professional footballer, who played as a midfielder or forward and currently is the assistant manager of Brøndby IF's U15 squad.

He has represented various Danish youth national football teams, most recently the Danish under-21 national team, playing a combined 58 youth national team matches and scoring 20 goals.
Named after “Kasper kühne Lorentzen”

Biography
As a youngster, he played for BK Frem and Rosenhøj IF where he played alongside later Brøndby teammembers Daniel Agger and Henrik Kildentoft as well as Michael Krohn-Dehli. He moved to the youth team of Brøndby IF and Lorentzen got his first team debut for Brøndby in November 2003. He was moved to the senior squad of Brøndby in 2004. For the 2005–06 season, he was touted to get his breakthrough by the media, who viewed him as a coming star player for Brøndby.

Due to injuries, Lorentzen only played 19 games and scored six goals in the 2005–06 season, and he also missed out on the 2006 European Under-21 Championship in May 2006. He again suffered injuries in the opening of the 2006–07 season. In his comeback game in the spring of the 2006–07 season he once again suffered an injury and is expected to be out for the rest of the season. On 19 May 2009, Lorentzen announced that he would be leaving Brøndby IF due to a lack of first team opportunities.
During the transfer window of summer 2009, Lorentzen joined Randers FC on a free transfer. He scored on in both legs of Randers FC's UEFA European League qualification round against the Irish team of Linfield.

Kasper Lorentzen is left-footed and has a superb technique and is generally considered to be the player in the Danish League with the best ball control and one of the greatest talents overall, but a lack of speed and explosivity in his game and a recent suffering of several semi-serious injuries kept him outside of the starting eleven at Brøndby. He can play both the left and right wing positions, but considers the attacking centre midfield his favourite position.

On 3 February 2015, Lorentzen announced that he would retire from professional football due to injuries, which had annoyed him throughout his career.

International career
Lorentzen was selected for a number of Danish youth national teams, winning the 2001 Danish Under-17 Player of the Year award. In November 2005, he scored the winning goal for the Danish under-21 national team against the Russia under-21 team in Russia. This gave Denmark the perfect starting point before the second leg at Brøndby Stadion in Denmark, which Denmark won 3–1 to secure qualification for the 2006 European Under-21 Championship tournament. He has represented various Danish youth national football teams, most recently the Danish under-21 national team, playing a combined 58 youth national team matches and scoring 20 goals.

International goals

|-
|1||October 12, 2010||Parken, Copenhagen, Denmark||||2–0||2–0||UEFA Euro 2012 qualifying
|}

Coaching career
In August 2019, Lorentzen was hired as a youth coach at Brøndby IF.

Honours

Club
Brøndby IF
 Danish Superliga:
 Winners: 2004-05
 Danish Cup:
 Winners (2): 2004–05, 2007–08

F.C. Nordsjælland
 Danish Superliga:
 Winners: 2011–12

Individual
 Danish Under-17 Player of the Year: 2001

References

External links
 Profile at FCN.dk 
 Brøndby IF profile 
 Career stats by Danmarks Radio
 Official Site

1985 births
Living people
Danish men's footballers
Denmark international footballers
Denmark under-21 international footballers
Brøndby IF players
Randers FC players
Danish Superliga players
FC Nordsjælland players
Association football midfielders
People from Hvidovre Municipality
Sportspeople from the Capital Region of Denmark